Alejandro Eduardo Goic Jerez (born 11 September 1957) is a Chilean actor. He appeared in more than fifty films since 1988.

Biography 

Alejandro Goic is the son of physician Alejandro Goic Goic and Carmen Jerez Horta, and the nephew of former Christian Democratic senator .

During his youth, Goic was active in the Socialist Youth and then the Socialist Party. After the 1973 military coup, he was interrogated and tortured by the DINA.  In the 1980s he went into exile in Sweden, where his daughter was born.

Selected filmography

References

External links 

1957 births
Living people
Chilean male film actors
Male actors from Santiago
Chilean people of Croatian descent
Chilean actor-politicians